Witch (Egyptian Arabic: ساحرة, translit. Sahira) is a 1971 Egyptian television short film written by Tawfiq al-Hakim and directed by Henry Barakat. The film stars Salah Zulfikar and Faten Hamama. The film is produced by Egyptian Television Network.

Synopsis 
The events take place in the year 1948, where delusions dominate the mind of Souad and she believes that she can be linked to Ezz El-Din, the man she loves through magic, so she puts a piece of sugar that she brought from one of the impostors in his cup of tea for her lover, Ezz El-Din. She manages to marry him, but the magic turns against the magician, as Ezz El-Din suffers severe pain in his stomach and learns about it.

Cast 

 Salah Zulfikar as Ezz El-Din
 Faten Hamama as Souad
 Adel Emam as Waiter
 Saeed Saleh as Waiter

See also 

 Short film
 Nefertiti y Aquenatos
 Salah Zulfikar filmography
 Faten Hamama filmography

References

External links 

 Witch on elCinema

1971 films
Egyptian short films